This is a list of NBA All-Star Game head coaches. The National Basketball Association All-Star Game is an annual basketball exhibition game held during the National Basketball Association (NBA) regular season. From 1951 to 2017, the All-Star Game was played between the Western Conference All-Stars and the Eastern Conference All-Stars, where the head coach for each All- Star team was the coach of the NBA team with the best record from their respective conference.

To ensure that a different coach represents their conference each year, there is a rule against a head coach making a consecutive appearance. Instead, the coach with the next best record is selected. This rule is known as the "Riley Rule" and was introduced in the early 1990s after the dominance of the 1980s Los Angeles Lakers team in the Western Conference, which was coached by Pat Riley. For the 2018 NBA All-Star Game, the format of the game changed. The starters and reserves were chosen as usual, but the two captains (one from each conference) draft their team from those starters and reserves. The coaches are also selected as usual, and matched with the captain from their respective conference. 

Only Lenny Wilkens (SuperSonics, Cavaliers, and Hawks) and Alex Hannum (Hawks, Warriors, and 76ers) have represented three separate teams as the All-Star Game coach. Red Auerbach, the head coach for the Boston Celtics between 1950–1966, coached the most All-Star Games with 11 appearances.

Key

Eastern Division / Conference (1951–2017)

Western Division / Conference (1951–2017)

Unconferenced format (2018–present)

Most selections

Notes

References

National Basketball Association coaches
Head coaches
All-Star Game head coaches